Sakegaon is a village in Bhusawal taluka, Jalgaon district, Maharashtra, India. 

According to the 2011 Indian Census, 9,195 people reside in 2,031 households in the village.

References

Bhusawal
Villages in Jalgaon district